

Gebmund was a medieval Bishop of Rochester. He was consecrated about 678. He died between 699 and 716.

Citations

References

External links
 

Bishops of Rochester
7th-century English bishops
693 deaths
Year of birth unknown